was a Japanese samurai warrior of the Sengoku period.

Masafusa was the son of Toki Shigeyori.

Masafusa was the shugo or governor of Mino Province.

He was the father of Toki Yoshiyori.

See also
 Toki clan

References

Daimyo
1467 births
1519 deaths